Yaroslav Oliynyk (born 14 March 1991) is a Ukrainian footballer who plays as a defender.

Career
Oliynyk after playing for FC Shakhtar Donetsk reserves team from June 2011 plays during one year on loan for FC Zorya .

In the 2020–21 season, Oliynyk played for FC Cherkashchyna. In April 2021, he joined Viktoriya Mykolaivka. In the 2021–22 season, he played for Polissya Stavky.

References

External links 

1991 births
Living people
Ukrainian footballers
FC Mariupol players
FC Shakhtar-3 Donetsk players
FC Zorya Luhansk players
FC Olimpik Donetsk players
FC Chornomorets Odesa players
Ukrainian Premier League players
Segunda División B players
Association football defenders
FC Tom Tomsk players
CD Castellón footballers
Ukrainian expatriate footballers
Expatriate footballers in Russia
Expatriate footballers in Spain
Footballers from Donetsk